Christian Cambas is a DJ and producer based in Athens, Greece. He is mostly known for his releases on DJ Umek’s 1605 label and his entry at number 88 of the DJ Mag Top 100 poll in 2005.  Besides 1605, he has released records on labels such as Toolroom, Great Stuff, Craft Music, Bedrock and many others.

Early music career 
Christian studied and graduated from the Berklee College of Music in 2000 with a degree in Music Production and Sound Engineering.  While living in Boston he started DJing, but was playing Drum & Bass.  During that time he also set up his own vinyl label called First Commandment Records.

While he worked at the Boston Beat record store, his love for early house music was put to good use.

After returning to Athens, Christian got involved in 4/4 production and remixing for Planetworks, a seminal Greek dance label. At the same time he briefly worked for a DJ booking agency in Athens.

While this was happening, Christian’s DJ tastes turned to the early dark progressive sounds of 2001. In some of his first gigs, he warmed up for artists including Carl Cox, John Digweed and Sasha. This led to a two-year residency at the +SODA in Athens.

First productions 
Now in full-on production mode, his debut track “It Scares Me” was released on John Digweed's Bedrock imprint and he has since gone on to record for some of the world's most respected labels. His early remix schedule included massive reworks such as that of Anarcrusan's “In My Mind” for Yoshitoshi/Shinichi.

In addition to his production career he also started teaching a college-level Sound Engineering and Music Technology course in 2003, which he is still involved in today.

DJ Mag Top 100 
2005 was an important year for Christian, as his touring schedule now included North and South America, Europe and Asia with gig highlights including the San Francisco Love parade and the WMC in Miami. It was this year that he broke into DJ Magazine's Top 100 DJs poll, coming in at number 88.

Devilock Records 
On 06/06/06 Devilock Records was conceived and was graced by high-profile artists such as Jerome Isma-Ae, The Horrorist, Thomas Penton and other top players of the time. At the moment Devilock Records is on hiatus, as Christian's new label with Press & Play Management, Sabotage Records is now his new endeavor.

Sabotage Records 
Sabotage Records is a partnership between Press & Play and Christian Cambas and the label specializes in cutting edge Techno and Tech House.

Sabotage is already the home to Phunk Investigation, Kiko, Electric Rescue, Alex Di Stefano, Axel Karakasis, and many others.

1605 and beyond 
Moving on to new territory, Christian's productions are now supported by a phalanx of scene-defining Techno jocks, and he is releasing tracks on labels such as UMEK's 1605, Great Stuff, Toolroom, Rusted and others.
He is also involved in another secretive project, the Saboteurs, who have released on their native Sabotage and have also remixed the likes of Spektre.

References 

 CAMBAS vs. PHNTM :::  Inferno ::: Great Stuff on sceen.fm May 2011
 Interview on Beatportal May 2011
 Interview on CrackHitler June 2009

External links 
 @christiancambas
 Christian Cambas | Listen and Stream Free Music, Albums, New Releases, Photos, Videos
 Tumblr
 pressandplaypr.com

Living people
Greek DJs
Greek record producers
Year of birth missing (living people)
Musicians from Athens
Electronic dance music DJs